Jim Kweskin (born July 18, 1940, Stamford, Connecticut) is an American folk, jazz, and blues musician, most notable as the founder of the Jim Kweskin Jug Band, also known as Jim Kweskin and the Jug Band, with Fritz Richmond, Geoff Muldaur, Bob Siggins and Bruno Wolfe. The Jug Band was a significant part of the folk and blues revival of the 1960s. Maria Muldaur, formerly with the Even Dozen Jug Band, joined the band in 1963. During the five years they were together, the Jug Band successfully modernized the sounds of pre–World War II rural music.

History
The Jug Band released six albums and two greatest hits compilations on Vanguard Records between 1963 and 1970; Jim Kweskin's America on Reprise Records in 1971; and four albums on Mountain Railroad Records between 1978 and 1987. As a solo act and with other combinations of musicians, Kweskin has continued to release albums into the 2010s.

Kweskin is most often recognized as a singer and bandleader, but he is also known for his guitar stylings, adapting the ragtime-blues fingerpicking of artists like Blind Boy Fuller and Mississippi John Hurt, while incorporating more sophisticated jazz and blues stylings into the mix. In 2013, the band held a reunion tour that included Jim Kweskin, Maria Muldaur, Geoff Muldaur, Richard Greene, Bill Keith, Cindy Cashdollar and Sam Bevan, most of whom were amongst its original members.

In the late 1960s, Kweskin joined the Fort Hill Community, which was founded by former Kweskin Jug Band harmonicist Mel Lyman in Boston. In the 1970s, Kweskin recorded some vocals for some Sesame Street inserts, most notably, "Ladybugs' Picnic". In the 1980s, he stopped recording and performing regularly in order to devote himself to building houses. The Fort Hill Community evolved into the Los Angeles–based Fort Hill Construction, of which Kweskin was a founding partner and where he works as vice president.

In the 21st century, he resumed making music, including tours and recordings with Geoff Muldaur, Meredith Axelrod, and Samoa Wilson.

Further reading
Eric Von Schmidt and Jim Rooney, Baby, Let Me Follow You Down: The Illustrated Story of the Cambridge Folk Years, 1979,  (out of print)

Jim Kweskin Jug Band members
Jim Kweskin – guitar, vocals, comb
Mel Lyman – harmonica, banjo
Bill Keith – banjo, pedal steel guitar
Fritz Richmond – jug, washtub bass
Richard Greene – fiddle
Maria Muldaur – vocals, percussion, fiddle
Geoff Muldaur – guitar, vocals, mandolin, washboard, kazoo
Bruno Wolfe – vocals
Bob Siggins – vocals, banjo

Discography

Jim Kweskin and the Jug Band: Albums
Unblushing Brassiness (1963)
Jug Band Music (1965)
Relax Your Mind (1966)
Jim Kweskin and the Jug Band (1966)
See Reverse Side for Title (1966) 
Garden of Joy (1967), later reissued as a double album with America, below
The Best of Jim Kweskin and the Jug Band (1968)
Whatever Happened to Those Good Old Days (1968)
Greatest Hits (1988)
Acoustic Swing & Jug (2006)
Vanguard Visionaries (2007)

Jim Kweskin and the Jug Band: Singles
"Minglewood" / "Sheik of Araby" (1967)
"I'll Be Your Baby Tonight" / "Circus Song"

Jim Kweskin: Albums (incomplete list)
Relax Your Mind (1966)
Jump for Joy (1967)
Jim Kweskin's America (1971), later reissued as a double album with Garden of Joy, above
Lives Again (1977)Side by Side (1979)Swing on a Star with Jim Kweskin and the Kids (1979)Now & Again (2003), with Samoa WilsonLive The Life (2004), with Samoa WilsonEnjoy Yourself (2009)Jug Band Extravaganza (2010), by Jim Kweskin, Geoff Muldaur, John Sebastian, David Grisman, Maria Muldaur, the Barbeque OrchestraJim Kweskin in the 21st Century (2015)Come On In (2016), by Jim Kweskin and Meredith AxelrodPenny's Farm (2016) by Jim Kweskin and Geoff MuldaurJim Kweskin Unjugged (2017)I Just Want To Be Horizontal'' (2020) by Samoa Wilson and Jim Kweskin.

References

External links
 Official website
 The Jim Kweskin Jug band at the 1964 Newport Folk Festival
 Illustrated Jim Kweskin & The Jug Band discography
 [  Allmusic.com entry]

1940 births
Living people
American male musicians
Jug band musicians
Musicians from Stamford, Connecticut